Duke of Syracuse is a Spanish–Duosicilian royal title that was created in 1940 in the defunct Peerage of the Two Sicilies by Infante Alfonso, heir to the throne of the Two Sicilies, for his newborn daughter Princess Inés. It makes reference to the city of Syracuse in the former Kingdom of the Two Sicilies. Although the original denomination was Count of Syracuse, it was elevated to a dukedom by the grantor.

Due to its nature as a title in the peerage of the Two Sicilies (ruled by the Spanish royal family and hence adhering to some Spanish customs) it follows the Spanish rules of succession, and so the heir apparent is female, the eldest child of Princess Inés, Isabel de Morales y Borbón-Dos Sicilias (born 10 April 1966), whose namesake godmother was Infanta Isabel Alfonsa.

Isabel de Morales married Joaquín Galán y Otamendi on 23 September 1995 in Toledo, Spain. The couple have two children:

Inés Galán de Morales y Borbón-Dos Sicilias (born 3 January 2000). Second in line to the Dukedom.
Carlota Galán de Morales y Borbón-Dos Sicilias. Third in line to the Dukedom.

Dukes of Syracuse
1940–present Princess Inés, Duchess of Syracuse

See also
Duke of Salerno (1937 creation)
List of dukes in the nobility of Italy

References

Syracuse